The Kipper Family was a two-man parody English folk group, played by Chris Sugden (as Sid Kipper) and Dick Nudds (as his father Henry).

History

The group performed as the Kipper Family throughout the 1980s and released several cult albums. Partly parodying the Copper Family, they performed their variations of traditional folk songs, with lyrics twisted to take in themes including cross-dressing, under-age sex, homosexuality at sea and the dissection of human cadavers.

In the early days, the Kipper Family would perform to crowds expecting an ordinary folk act, firmly staying in character during the whole period in the public eye, and it would be several songs into the set before the penny dropped. Later recordings include "We're Norfolk and Good", "Arrest These Merry Gentlemen" and "Bored of the Dance" and also a folk opera, The Crab Wars. In addition to the released LPs, Christmas with the Kippers, a Christmas special, was recorded for BBC Radio Two.

They were seen once on British television. The children's programme, Get Fresh, featured a spaceship that would arrive in a different location each Saturday morning. One Saturday the destination was Trunch, and who should be there but Sid and Henry. The duo split at the end of 1991.

In 2006, Sugden presented a series of podcasts for Channel 4 radio called The Kipper Country Code, as Sid Kipper.

Chris Sugden has now retired the character of Sid Kipper.

Characters
The duo would put on Norfolk accents and delivered Norfolk inspired humour. Their appearance was just like any other folk singers. Sid with slicked back hair, a smart suit and a kipper tie, the look of a spiv. And Henry (Nudds made to look like an old man) with a threadbare cardigan and string to hold up his trousers in place of a belt.

Often, as with all comedy doubles, they would swap being one down or one up with their replies:
Henry: "If you are trying to be clever with me, you're wastin' your time".
Sid: "That's true yes".

The fictional village of St. Just-near-Trunch, is known as the home of the Kipper Family.

When the duo split in 1991, Henry Kipper was pronounced dead. Sugden felt that he had to kill off the character as people kept asking when Henry would return.

Albums

Sid Kipper
Like A Rhinestone Ploughboy (1994)
Spineless (1997)
Boiled in the Bag (1997)
East Side Story (2000)
Cod Pieces (2002)
Chained Melody (2003)
In Season (2007)
Gutless (2011)

The Kipper Family
Since Time Immoral (1984)
The Ever Decreasing Circle (1985)
The Crab Wars (1986)
Fresh Yesterday (1988)
Arrest These Merry Gentlemen (1989)
In the Family Way (1991)
Two-Faced (2011)

References

External links
 The Kipper Family:  Sid and Henry Kipper tribute site
 The Kipper Family at Myspace
 Garry Gillard's Kipper pages

People from North Norfolk (district)
British parodists
Parody musicians
Fictional musicians